Pseudocalyx is a genus of flowering plants belonging to the family Acanthaceae.

Its native range is Gabon to Tanzania and Southern Tropical Africa, Madagascar.

Species:

Pseudocalyx aurantiacus 
Pseudocalyx libericus 
Pseudocalyx macrophyllus 
Pseudocalyx ochraceus 
Pseudocalyx pasquierorum 
Pseudocalyx saccatus

References

Acanthaceae
Acanthaceae genera